Maret may refer to:

 Maret (name)
 Les Marêts, a commune in the Seine-et-Marne département in the Île-de-France region in north-central France
 Maret School, a private, secular, co-educational, college-preparatory school located in northwest Washington, D.C., USA
 March, in Indonesian month calendar

See also
 
 
 Marest
 Mareth, city, ship, surname, fortification
 Marot
 Merit (disambiguation)